Events in the year 1930 in India.

Incumbents
 Emperor of India – George V
 Viceroy of India – The Lord Irwin

Events

 National income - 31,435 million
 26 January – The Indian National Congress declares January 26 as Independence Day, or the day for Poorna Swaraj (Complete Independence).
 28 February - Sir C V Raman Received Nobel Prize in Physics.
 2 March – Mohandas Gandhi informs British viceroy of India that civil disobedience would begin nine days later.
 12 March – Mohandas Gandhi sets off to a 200-mile protest march towards the sea with 78 followers to protest the British monopoly on salt – more will join them during the Salt March that ends on 5 April.
 6 April – In an act of civil disobedience, Mahatma Gandhi breaks British law after marching to the sea and taking salt.
 18 April – Chittagong armoury raid also known as Chittagong uprising.
 30 April – The Vedaranyam Salt satyagraha led by Rajaji and Sardar Vedarathinam Pillai culminates in South India
 4–5 May – Mohandas Gandhi is arrested again.
 October – First Round Table Conference opens in London.
 28 December – Mohandas Gandhi leaves for Britain for negotiations

Law
 Publication of the report of the Simon Commission.
Sale of Goods Act
Hindu Gains of Learning Act

Births

6 June – Sunil Dutt, actor, producer, director and politician (died 2005).
7 June – Chitrananda Abeysekera, Sri Lankan veteran broadcaster (died 1992)
10 June – Satya Priya Mahathero, Bangladeshi Buddhist pundit, religious leader and social worker (died 2019)
26 June – Mehli Irani, cricketer (died 2021)
9 July – Kailasam Balachander, Producer, Director, Actor (died 2014).
11 July – Shafiqur Rahman Barq, politician
10 August – R. Nagaswamy, historian and archaeologist (died 2022).
5 November – Arjun Singh, politician and Minister  (died 2011).
18 November – Jai Narain Prasad Nishad, politician (died 2018)
23 November – Geeta Dutt, playback singer (died 1972).

Full date unknown
Bahadoor, actor (died 2000).
Geeta Bali, actress (died 1965).

Deaths
 12 May Kaikhusrau Jahan, Begum of Bhopal (born 1858)
 16 September – Martial Paillot, French Roman Catholic missionary, history professor and parish priest
 28 September – T K Madhavan, the architect of Vaikam Sayagraham and organizing secretary of SNDP Yogam.

References

 
India
Years of the 20th century in India